The 2002–03 ISU Short Track Speed Skating World Cup was a multi-race tournament over a season for short track speed skating. The season began on 18 October 2002 and ended on 16 February 2003. The World Cup was organised by the International Skating Union who also ran world cups and championships in speed skating and figure skating.

The World Cup consisted of six tournaments in this season.

Calendar

Men

Korea

China

Russia

Italy

United States

Canada

Women

Korea

China

Russia

Italy

United States

Canada

Overall Standings

Men

Women

See also
 2003 World Short Track Speed Skating Championships
 2003 World Short Track Speed Skating Team Championships
 2003 European Short Track Speed Skating Championships

References

External Links
 Results for 2002-2003 SEASON at the International Skating Union

ISU Short Track Speed Skating World Cup
2002 in short track speed skating
2003 in short track speed skating